Luzuriaga radicans (quilineja) is a species of flowering plant in the genus Luzuriaga of the family Alstroemeriaceae  (Inca-lilies), part of the monocot order Liliales.

Description 

Luzuriaga radicans is an evergreen climbing plant, whose fine roots adhere to the trunks of trees. The leaves are alternate, distal and with an entire border, oblong-lanceolate in shape, the acute tip ending abruptly. They are light green in color, and from 1–4 cm in length and 0.3–1 cm wide, with 9–13 white lines on the undersurface. The flowers are hermaphroditic, 1 cm in length and either single or forming an inflorescence with 2–4 flowers. The six white tepals are uneven in size. There are six stamens, and the style, which is longer than the stamens, ends in a tri-lobed stigma. The fruit is a smooth, globose berry, red-orange in color and 0.8–1 cm in diameter, with up to twelve flattened seeds about 4 mm in length.

Taxonomy 

Luzuriaga radicans was first described by the Spanish botanists Hipólito Ruiz López and José Antonio Pavón Jiménez in 1802, and consequently the botanical authority is stated as Ruiz et Pavón. It is the type-species of genus Luzuriaga, which includes four species.

Etymology 

The epithet radicans (Latin: with rooting stems), refers to the characteristic climbing roots.

Distribution and habitat 

Luzuriaga radicans is native to South Central to South Chile and South Argentina. In Chile, it grows from Colchagua to Aisén provinces (regions VI–XI), where it prefers a shady humid environment with constant rainfall under dense vegetation cover. In coastal areas it grows up to 500 m, while in coastal mountain areas its range is 500–2000  m. It also occurs at low altitudes in interior valleys.

Ecology 

The plant grows either in water or with its roots in water, including marshes, bogs, and the shores of lakes and rivers.

Conservation 

The plant, and hence its uses, has become scarce, due to overusage and the destruction of forests. However it can be found in protected areas such as the Llancahue reserve near Valdivia.

Cultivation 

Cultivation is difficult. After the vine has been removed from the tree, it takes about 5 years to regrow.

Uses 

The plant is valued as an ornamental, while the stems are used in the manufacture of household utensils and handicrafts, including basketry and brooms. Historically it was also used for fences and ropes, but now it is mainly used for artisanal crafts. The fruit is edible and eaten raw, and was a traditional food, but has fallen out of use.

In popular culture 

Luzuriaga radicans appears in Chilote mythology, where a creature called Trauco clothes himself in the plant and sustains himself on its fruit.

References

Bibliography 

Books and theses
 
 
 , also at El Real Jardín Botánico, Madrid
 
 
Websites

External links 

Alstroemeriaceae
Endemic flora of Chile